Darevskia unisexualis  is a lizard species in the genus Darevskia. It is found in Armenia, Georgia, and Turkey.

References

Darevskia
Reptiles described in 1966
Taxa named by Ilya Darevsky